The Danish Men's Curling Championship is the national championship of men's curling in Denmark. It has been held annually since 1971.

List of champions

References
Past Champions|Hvidovre Curling Club (in Danish)

See also
Danish Women's Curling Championship
Danish Mixed Curling Championship
Danish Mixed Doubles Curling Championship
Danish Junior Curling Championships
Danish Senior Curling Championships

Curling competitions in Denmark
Men's sports competitions in Denmark
Recurring sporting events established in 1971
1971 establishments in Denmark
National curling championships
Curling